Richard Franklin may refer to:
Richard Franklin (actor) (born 1936), British actor
Richard Franklin (director) (1948–2007), Australian-born film director
Richard C. Franklin, sound editor
Richard Penrose Franklin (1884–1942), headmaster of Melbourne Grammar School
Sir Richard Franklin, 1st Baronet (1630–1685), of the Franklin baronets
Sir Richard Franklin, 2nd Baronet (c. 1655–1695), of the Franklin baronets
Rich Franklin (born 1974), American mixed martial artist

See also
Rick Franklin, American Piedmont blues guitarist, singer and songwriter

Franklin (surname)